Scott Budnick may refer to:
Scott Budnick (soccer) (born 1971), retired American soccer player
Scott Budnick (film producer), American film producer